"Heaven Sent" is a song by Canadian singer-songwriter Esthero. It was released as first official (second overall) single from her debut album Breath from Another and peaking at number four on the Billboard Hot Dance Breakout Singles Sales chart.

The song was featured on the VH1 show Breaking Bonaduce.

Writing
Esthero and Doc McKinney wrote the song in a single night in August 1996.

Music video 
The music video for the single was filmed in June 1998 and released the next month. It was heavily influenced by Luis Buñuel avant-garde silent movie Un Chien Andalou starring Salvador Dalí. It was directed by Phil Harder. In late 1998, the video premiered on MTV, where it received some airplay. The video also went into rotation on MuchMusic. A promotional VHS featuring the music video was also released, and is now something of a collector's item.

The music video went into moderate rotation on MTV, reaching number 27 on their list of most-played videos, peaking on the chart dated August 15, 1998.

Track listing 
CD Single
"Heaven Sent" - 4:29
"Heaven Sent" (Mad Professor Dub) - 4:56
"Breath From Another" (Part 7 & 11 Remix) - 6:36
"Breath From Another" (DJ Krust Sitting On Chrome Mix) - 10:08
"Breath From Another" (Orpheus Floating Mix)- 7:17

Charts

References 

1998 singles
Esthero songs
1998 songs
Sony Music singles
Songs written by Doc McKinney
Songs written by Esthero